Whispering Pines is a census-designated place (CDP) in Gila County, Arizona, United States. It is one of two locations in Arizona with this name, the other being a populated place in Greenlee County. The population was 148 at the 2010 United States Census.

Geography
Whispering Pines is located in northern Gila County in the upper valley of the East Verde River, between Washington Park to the north and Beaver Valley to the south.

Demographics

References

Census-designated places in Gila County, Arizona
Census-designated places in Arizona